Donald Unamba, Jr. (born February 23, 1989) is a professional Canadian football defensive back who is currently a free agent. He most recently played for the Ottawa Redblacks of the Canadian Football League (CFL).

College career
Unamba played College Football for Southern Arkansas University.

Professional career
He was signed as an undrafted free agent by the Winnipeg Blue Bombers on April 2, 2014.

On August 18, 2015, Unamba was signed by the Saskatchewan Roughriders, who signed him to the practice roster.

On December 19, 2016, Unamba signed with the Salt Lake Screaming Eagles.

Unamba re-signed with the Ottawa Redblacks on February 9, 2021. He played for one season with the Redblacks and became a free agent upon the expiry of his contract on February 8, 2022.

References

External links
Ottawa Redblacks bio

Living people
Canadian football defensive backs
1989 births
Sportspeople from Arlington, Texas
Winnipeg Blue Bombers players
Saskatchewan Roughriders players
Salt Lake Screaming Eagles players
Hamilton Tiger-Cats players
Players of American football from Texas
American players of Canadian football
Edmonton Elks players
Ottawa Redblacks players